Toybox Records was a record label from Gainesville, Florida and Chicago, Illinois that existed from 1992 to 1997. It was started by Sean Bonner when he lived in Bradenton, Florida, shortly before moving to Gainesville. The label closed when he lived in Chicago.

Bands
 Alpha Jerk
 Andromeda
 Ascension
 Crud is a Cult
 Culture
 Dragbody
 Grade
 Hot Water Music
 Integrity
 Less Than Jake
 Spoke

Catalog

References

External links
 Sean Bonner Website

Hardcore record labels
Defunct record labels of the United States